Rygos naujenos (literally: news of Riga) was a Lithuanian-language newspaper printed in Riga, Latvia, from December 29, 1909 to July 11, 1915. Liberal in political orientation, but nationalist (pro-Lithuanian) and anti-communist, the paper was the most widely circulated newspaper amongst Lithuanian citizens residing in Latvia. It was founded and edited by Liudvikas Jakavičius.

Publication history
Its first issue was published on December 29, 1909, and it was issued every week until July 11, 1915. The newspaper was printed in black and white and its main emphasis was Lithuanian politics, economics, literature and the social life of notable Lithuanian nationals living abroad. The newspaper was liberal, but nationalist (pro-Lithuanian) and anti-communist in political ideology.

The most distinguished contributors of Rygos naujenos were Tadas Balanda; Zigmas Gaidamavičius (poet); Konstantinas Jasiukaitis (writer); Jonas Krikščiūnas (poet); Kazys Puida (writer); Ona Pleirytė (writer); Balys Sruoga (writer); Juozas Petrulis (historian) and Kostas Stiklius (journalist). The printing house which produced the newspaper, called "Lietuvos Knygynas," was located in 20 Kataliku Street in Riga, Latvia.

References

External links 
 Searchable PDF archive of Rygos naujienos (1909–1915)

Newspapers published in Latvia
Lithuanian-language newspapers
Newspapers established in 1909
Publications disestablished in 1915
Mass media in Riga
1909 establishments in the Russian Empire
1915 disestablishments in Latvia
Newspapers published in the Russian Empire